Trevor Myles is a British former fashion entrepreneur and designer who ran the Mr Freedom boutique at 430 King's Road, Chelsea, London and later in Kensington Church Street, with his business partner Tommy Roberts.

References

English businesspeople in retailing
British fashion designers
Living people
Year of birth missing (living people)
Place of birth missing (living people)
King's Road, Chelsea, London